The Original High Tour was the third solo (sixth overall) concert tour by American singer/songwriter Adam Lambert, launched in support of his third studio album, The Original High. The tour began on December 31, 2015 in Singapore and continued throughout China, Japan, South Korea, New Zealand, Australia, United States and Europe concluding in Munich on May 6, 2016.

Set list 
 "Evil in the Night"
 "For Your Entertainment"
 "Ghost Town"
 "Welcome to the Show" (Europe only and some North America)
 "Runnin'"
 "Chokehold"
 "Sleepwalker"
 "Underground"
 "Rumors"
 "Lucy"
 "After Hours"
 "Outlaws of Love"
 "Whataya Want from Me"
 "Mad World"
 "There I Said It"
 "Another Lonely Night"
 "The Light"
 "The Original High"
 "Let's Dance" 
 "Never Close Our Eyes"
 "Lay Me Down"
 "Shady"
 "Fever"
 "Trespassing"
 "Another One Bites the Dust"
Encore
 "If I Had You"

Notes 
 In Boston and the European leg of the tour, "If I Had You" was done as the last song of the main set and then a medley of "Trespassing/Another One Bites the Dust" was the encore.

Tour dates 

Rescheduled shows

Tour band
Adam Lambert – lead vocals
Peter Dyer – keyboards and musical director
Adam Ross – electric guitars
Brook Alexander – drums
Darwin Johnson – bass
Holly Hyman – dancer, vocals
Terrance Spencer – dancer, vocals

References

External links 
 Adam Lambert official website

2016 concert tours
Adam Lambert concert tours